Neoxyletobius is a genus of death-watch and spider beetles in the family Ptinidae. There are at least two described species in Neoxyletobius.

Species
These two species belong to the genus Neoxyletobius:
 Neoxyletobius kirkaldyi (Perkins, 1910)
 Neoxyletobius oculatus (Sharp, 1881)

References

Further reading

 
 
 
 
 
 

Ptinidae